Baraka is a 1992 American non-narrative documentary film directed by Ron Fricke. The film is often compared to Koyaanisqatsi, the first of the Qatsi films by Godfrey Reggio for which Fricke served as cinematographer. It was photographed in the 70 mm Todd-AO format, and is the first film ever to be restored and scanned at 8K resolution.

Content
Baraka is a documentary film with no narrative or voice-over. It explores themes via a compilation of natural events, life, human activities and technological phenomena shot in 24 countries on six continents over a 14-month period.

The film is named after the Islamic concept of baraka, meaning blessing, essence or breath.

The film is Ron Fricke's follow-up to Godfrey Reggio's similar non-verbal documentary film Koyaanisqatsi. Fricke was cinematographer and collaborator on Reggio's film, and for Baraka he struck out on his own to polish and expand the photographic techniques used on Koyaanisqatsi. Shot in 70 mm, it includes a mixture of photographic styles including slow motion and time-lapse. Two camera systems were used to achieve this. A Todd-AO system was used to shoot conventional frame rates, but to execute the film's time-lapse sequences Fricke had a special camera built that combined time-lapse photography with perfectly controlled movements.

Locations featured include the Church of the Holy Sepulchre in Jerusalem, the Ryōan temple in Kyoto, Lake Natron in Tanzania, burning oil fields in Kuwait, the smouldering precipice of an active volcano, a busy subway terminal, the aircraft boneyard of Davis–Monthan Air Force Base, tribal celebrations of the Maasai in Kenya, and chanting monks in the Dip Tse Chok Ling monastery.

The film features a number of long tracking shots through various settings, including Auschwitz and Tuol Sleng, over photos of the people involved, past skulls stacked in a room, to a spread of bones. It suggests a universal cultural perspective: a shot of an elaborate tattoo on a bathing Japanese yakuza precedes a view of tribal paint.

Reissue
Following previous DVD releases, in 2007 the original 65 mm negative was rescanned at 8K resolution with equipment designed specifically for Baraka at FotoKem Laboratories. The automated 8K film scanner, operating continuously, took more than three weeks to finish scanning more than 150,000 frames (taking approximately twelve to thirteen seconds to scan each frame), producing over thirty terabytes of image data in total.

After a 16-month digital intermediate process, including a 96 kHz/24-bit audio remaster by Stearns for the DTS-HD Master Audio soundtrack, the result was re-released on DVD and Blu-ray in October 2008. At the time, project supervisor Andrew Oran described the reissue of Baraka as "arguably the highest-quality DVD that's ever been made". Chicago Sun-Times critic Roger Ebert described the Blu-ray release as "the finest video disc I have ever viewed or ever imagined."

Sequel
A sequel to Baraka, Samsara, also shot in 70 mm and made by the same filmmakers, premiered at the 2011 Toronto International Film Festival and was released internationally in August 2012.

Reception
Baraka holds a score of 81% on Rotten Tomatoes out of twenty-six reviews. Roger Ebert included the film in his "Great Movies" list, writing: "If man sends another Voyager to the distant stars and it can carry only one film on board, that film might be Baraka."

Production

Music

The score is by Michael Stearns and features music by, among others, Dead Can Dance, L. Subramaniam, Ciro Hurtado, Inkuyo, Brother, Anugama & Sebastiano and David Hykes.

In 2019, German composer Mathias Rehfeldt released the concept album Baraka, inspired by the film.

Filming
The project was shot in 152 locations in 24 countries.

Africa
Egypt: Cairo; City of the Dead; Giza pyramid complex; Karnak temple, Luxor; Ramesseum
Kenya: Lake Magadi; Mara Kichwan Tembo Manyatta; Mara Rianta Manyatta; Maasai Mara
Tanzania: Lake Natron

United States
Arizona: American Express, Phoenix; Canyon de Chelly National Monument, Chinle; Davis–Monthan Air Force Base, Tucson; Peabody coal mine, Black Mesa; Phoenix
California: Big Sur; Los Angeles; Santa Cruz (chicken farm scenes)
Colorado: Mesa Verde National Park
Hawaii: Haleakalā National Park, Maui; Kona; Puʻu ʻŌʻō, Hawaiʻi Volcanoes National Park
New York: Empire State Building, Manhattan, New York City; Grand Central Terminal, Manhattan, New York City; Helmsley Building, Manhattan, New York City; McGraw-Hill Building, Manhattan, New York City; World Trade Center, Manhattan, New York City; Green Haven Correctional Facility, Beekman, New York; Stormville, New York
Utah: Arches National Park, Moab; Canyonlands National Park, Moab
Others: Shiprock, New Mexico; White House, Washington, D.C.

South America
Argentina: Iguazu Falls, Misiones
Brazil: Carajás Animal Reserve, Pará; Iguazu Falls, Paraná; Ipanema, Favela da Rocinha, Rio de Janeiro; Caiapó Village, Pará; Porto Velho, Rondônia; Represa Samuel, Rondônia; Rio Preto, Minas Gerais; São Paulo City, São Paulo state
Ecuador: Barrio Mapasingue, Guayaquil; Cementerio Ciudad Blanca; Galápagos Islands; Guayaquil

Asia
Cambodia: Angkor Thom; Angkor Wat; Angkor; Bayon; Phnom Penh; Preah Khan; Siem Reap; Ta Prohm; Tonle Omm Gate; Tuol Sleng Museum; Sonsam Kosal Killing Fields
China: Beijing; Great Hall of the People; Tiananmen Square; Guilin; Li River, Qin Shi Huang; Xi'an
Hong Kong: Kowloon Walled City, Kowloon
India: Calcutta, West Bengal; Chennai, Tamil Nadu; Ganges River; Ghats; Kailashnath Temple, Varanasi; National Museum of India, New Delhi; Varadharaja Temple, Varanasi
Indonesia: Borobudur; Java; Candi Nandi; Candi Prambanan; Gudang Garam cigarette factory; Kasunanan Palace; Surakarta; Istiqlal Mosque, Jakarta; Kediri; Tabanan; Bali; Mancan Padi; Mount Bromo Valley; Tampak Siring; Tegallalang; Gunung Kawi temple; Uluwatu
Iran: Imam Mosque; Imam Reza Shrine, Mashhad; Isfahan; Persepolis; Shah Chiragh; Shiraz
Japan: Green Plaza Capsule Hotel; Hokke-Ji temple; JVC Yokosuka Factory; Kyoto; Meiji Shrine; Nagano Springs; Nara; Nittaku; Ryōan-ji temple; Sangho-ji Temple; Shinjuku Station; Tokyo; the Hachikō Exit, Shibuya Station; Tomoe Shizung & Hakutobo; Yamanouchi, Nagano; Zōjō-ji temple
Jerusalem: Church of the Holy Sepulchre; Western Wall
Kuwait: Ahmadi; Burgan Field; Jahra Road, Mitla Ridge (Farouk Abdul-Aziz researched and produced this segment)
Nepal: Bhaktapur; Boudhanath; Durbar Square, Kathmandu; Hanuman Ghat; Himalayas; Mount Everest; Mount Thamserku; Pasupati; Swayambhu
Saudi Arabia: Mecca
Thailand: Ayutthaya Province; Bang Pa-In; Bangkok; NMB Factory; Patpong; Soi Cowboy; Wat Arun; Wat Suthat
Turkey: Galata Mevlevi temple

Oceania
Australia: Bathurst Island; Cocinda; Jim Jim Falls; Kakadu National Park; Kunwarde Hwarde Valley; Uluru

Europe
Poland: Oświęcim (German Auschwitz concentration camp); Sztutowo (German Stutthof concentration camp); Bytom
France: Chartres Cathedral; Notre-Dame de Reims
Vatican City: St. Peter's Basilica
Turkey: Hagia Sophia, Istanbul

See also
Abstract animation
Chronos (film)
Cinéma pur
Cinéma vérité

References

External links
Official website

Baraka at Spirit of Baraka

1992 films
1992 in the environment
American documentary films
Documentary films about spirituality
Environmental films
Films directed by Ron Fricke
Films scored by Michael Stearns
Films shot in Argentina
Films shot in Australia
Films shot in Brazil
Films shot in Cambodia
Films shot in China
Films shot in Ecuador
Films shot in Egypt
Films shot in Hong Kong
Films shot in India
Films shot in Indonesia
Films shot in Iran
Films shot in Israel
Films shot in Japan
Films shot in Kenya
Films shot in Kuwait
Films shot in Nepal
Films shot in Poland
Films shot in Saudi Arabia
Films shot in Tanzania
Films shot in Thailand
Films shot in Turkey
Films without speech
Non-narrative films
The Samuel Goldwyn Company films
Films shot in Bhaktapur
Films shot in Kolkata
Films shot in Chennai
Films shot in Varanasi
Films shot in Delhi
Documentary films about India
1990s American films